The PHOS Camden Football Club is an Australian rules football club based in the south western suburbs of Adelaide which was formed in 1994 as a merger between the Plympton High Old Scholars Football Club and Camden Football Club, who had broken away from an existing merger with the Greek Football Club.  The club has participated in the South Australian Amateur Football League since being formed.

A-Grade Premierships 
 South Australian Amateur Football League Division 1 (2)
 2000 
 2002 
 Channel 9 Adelaide Football League Division 3 (1)
 2015

Merger history 
PHOS Camden was formed in 1994 through the amalgamation of Plympton High Old Scholars Football Club and the remnants of the Camden Football Club.

Plympton High Old Scholars (PHOS) 
The Plympton High Old Scholars Football Club was formed in 1971 and based at Myer Oval (later to be known as N. S. Bull Memorial Oval), behind the former Plympton High School.  In 1994 the club relocated to Camden Oval as part of a merger with the remnants of the former Camden Football Club to become PHOS Camden.

A-Grade Premierships
 South Australian Amateur Football League A3 (1)
 1989 
 South Australian Amateur Football League A4 (1)
 1979 
 South Australian Amateur Football League A5 (2)
 1972 
 1977

Camden 

The Camden Football Club Mid-Southern Football Association.  Camden Football Club began in 1929 in the then Glenelg Districts Football Association when a group of friends, who lived in Camden, decided to form a football club.
The club colours were decided as chocolate and blue (the State colours of the time) and the jumper design was alternate chocolate and blue stripes. and continued in the Glenelg District Football Association and remained in that competition throughout its name changes until it folded at the end of 1986, then known as the Southern Metropolitan Football League.  In 1987 the club merged with Greek Football Club to form the Greek Camden Football Club.  This merger would last until 1993 when the club split back into Greek and Camden, with Camden forming a new merger with the Plympton High Old Scholars Football Club to form the PHOS Camden Football Club.

A-Grade Premierships

 Glenelg District Football Association (1)
 1937 
 Glenelg-South-West District Football Association A1 (1)
 1959 
 Glenelg-South Adelaide Football Association A1 (4)
 1972 
 1974 
 1975 
 1976

Greek Camden 

The Greek Camden Football Club was formed in 1987 from a merger of the Greek Football Club and the Camden Football Club.  In 1994 the club split back into Greek and Camden, with Greek forming a new merger with the Henley District and Old Scholars Football Club to form the Henley Greek Football Club, and Camden forming a new merger with the Plympton High Old Scholars Football Club to form the PHOS Camden Football Club.

 South Australian Amateur Football League A1 (2)
 1990 Undefeated 
 1991

AFL players 
Ryan Burton
Brayden Maynard 
Matthew Scharenberg
Will Day

References

External links
 

Australian rules football clubs in South Australia
Australian rules football clubs established in 1994
1994 establishments in Australia
Adelaide Footy League clubs